The 2022–23 season was the 123rd season in the existence of Cercle Brugge K.S.V. and the club's 28th consecutive season in the top flight of Belgian football. In addition to the domestic league, Cercle Brugge K.S.V. will participate in this season's edition of the Belgian Cup.

Players

First-team squad

Other players under contract

Out on loan

Transfers

Pre-season and friendlies

Competitions

Overall record

First Division A

League table

Results summary

Results by round

Matches
The league fixtures were announced on 8 June 2022.

Belgian Cup

References

Cercle Brugge K.S.V. seasons
Cercle Brugge